Thomson Township may refer to the following places in the United States:

Thomson Township, Carlton County, Minnesota
Thomson Township, Scotland County, Missouri

See also

Thompson Township (disambiguation)
Thomson (disambiguation)

Township name disambiguation pages